Million Dollar Mystery (also known as Money Mania) is a 1987 American film released with a promotional tie-in for Glad-Lock brand bags. This was the final feature-length film directed by Richard Fleischer.
It starred an ensemble cast of "America's new comic talent". The film was largely inspired by Stanley Kramer's It's a Mad, Mad, Mad, Mad World.

Dar Robinson, a stuntman, died on November 21, 1986 after riding his motorcycle off a cliff while attempting to do a stunt.

Plot 
Sidney Preston, a disgruntled White House aide, takes off with $4 million that belonged to the government. While on the run, he stops at a roadside diner in Arizona and has their world-famous chili, while flirting with the waitress. Two clumsy government spies named Fred and Bob are looking for Sidney. Sidney suffers a fatal heart attack and before dying asks for a kiss from the waitress, then he reveals to the onlookers the location of the first million dollars which he says is "In the city of the bridge". The onlookers are the Briggs Family (Stuart, Barbara, and Howie), nerdy newlyweds Rollie and Lollie, amateur singer Crush and his group of three blonde backup dancers (Faith, Hope, and Charity), brother/cook Tugger and sister/waitress Dotty. Soon, they meet professional wrestlers Bad Boris and Awful Abdul, cops Officer Gretchen and Officer Quinn, and deranged ranger Slaughter Buzzard.

The onlookers are skeptical, until Rollie turns on the television which is playing the news talking about Sidney Preston and the buried money. The newsman talks about his life and says he was born in El Puente, Arizona. The onlookers of the diner head out on a mad dash to find the dough. When they find the money in El Puente's famous bridge, Slaughter accidentally drops it into the canyon. They follow clues to the next million which is in Sidney's houseboat and lose it as well as it gets shredded in Sidney's table-sized paper shredder. After finding and losing the third million as it falls out of the hands of a greedy aeronaut, they all give up as the movie ends. During the closing credits, Bob informs the audience that there is one million dollars somewhere in the US and if they follow the clues in specially marked Glad-Lock bags, they have the chance to win $1 million.

Cast

Production
Parts of the film were shot at Glen Canyon in Utah.

While performing a routine stunt for this film, stuntman Dar Robinson died on November 21, 1986.

Marketing contest
Producer Dino De Laurentiis conceived the idea for Million Dollar Mystery when he visited New York and saw a row of people lining up for what he presumably thought was a movie. A companion told De Laurentiis that they were actually lining up for lottery tickets.

Glad Bags sponsored a sweepstakes timed for the film's release. The company gave away entry forms, and the audience would fill out these forms with their answer to where the last million is hiding, based on clues given in the film. De Laurentiis said of the film:

De Laurentiis had high expectations for the film, but it did not turn out to be a hit. The winner of the contest ended up being 14-year-old Alesia Lenae Jones of Bakersfield, California, who successfully guessed that the loot was hidden in bridge of the nose of the Statue of Liberty. Apparently, thousands of contestants had arrived at the same answer, and her entry was chosen in a random drawing.

Reception

Million Dollar Mystery was a box office flop grossing $989,033 against a $10 million budget.

The film received negative critical reviews. The film holds a 0% rating on Rotten Tomatoes based on 6 reviews.

Home media
The film was released on VHS and Laserdisc by HBO Video in 1987 with the contest info at the end of the movie omitted. It was later issued by Anchor Bay Entertainment on DVD in 2007 with the theatrical ending intact, and reissued again on DVD and Blu-ray by Kino Lorber in Spring 2021.

Award nominations
Golden Raspberry Awards
 Nominated: Worst Original Song, Barry Mann & John Lewis Parker (1988)
 Nominated: Worst Supporting Actor, Tom Bosley (1988)
 Nominated: Worst Supporting Actor, Jamie Alcroft (1988)
 Nominated: Worst Supporting Actor, Mack Dryden (1988)

References

External links
 
 
 

1987 films
1987 comedy films
Films directed by Richard Fleischer
Treasure hunt films
Puzzle hunts
De Laurentiis Entertainment Group films
Films shot in Utah
Films with screenplays by Rudy De Luca
1980s English-language films
American comedy mystery films
1980s American films